The 1941 Richmond Spiders football team was an American football team that represented the University of Richmond in the Southern Conference during the 1941 college football season. In their eighth and final season under head coach Glenn Thistlethwaite, the Spiders compiled a 2–7 record (0–6 against conference opponents), finished in last place in the conference, and were outscored by a total of 184 to 57. The team played its home games at City Stadium in Richmond, Virginia.

Schedule

References

Richmond
Richmond Spiders football seasons
Richmond Spiders football